Pelon Pelo Rico is a popular tamarind-flavored candy made under the Lorena brand by the Hershey Company in Jalisco, Mexico. The product originated in Guadalajara.

The treat's name loosely translates in English to "Yummy Hair Baldie", because the candy is squeezed out of a tube through a grate, producing a Medusa-like effect.

It comes in regular, sour lime, watermelon, and extra spicy flavors. Ingredients include sugar, water, glucose, chili powder, citric acid, xanthan gum, and tamarind extract. 

Pelon Pelo Rico is inexpensive, being sold for approximately US$0.50 at corner stores, and is commonly found in Mexican-owned stores and markets.

It is enjoyed in both Mexico and the U.S.

Popular culture
In 2005, NASCAR driver Kevin Harvick ran a Pelon Pelo Rico car in the Telcel-Motorola México 200. Harvick placed second, losing to Martin Truex Jr., in the Mexico City race.

See also
 List of confectionery brands

References

External links
 Mexican official site

The Hershey Company brands